Clouded Reveries is a 2022 Irish biographical film about Irish writer Doireann Ní Ghríofa.

Aisling Trí Néallaibh: Clouded Reveries is an intimate exploration of acclaimed poet and essayist Ní Ghríofa’s world and creative process. It is a film about memories, motherhood and the mysterious nature of creativity. Captured through intimate performances of her own work and in-depth interviews, the film reveals Ní Ghríofa’s creative impulses and journeys with her to the heart of her inspiration, her home place in Co. Clare.

This film was funded by The Arts Council (Ireland) and TG4.

References

External links 

Clouded Reveries Trailer on YouTube

2020s biographical films
Irish biographical films